This is a list of states in the Holy Roman Empire beginning with the letter E:

References

E